KCHD-CA was a low-power Class A television station in Cheyenne, Wyoming, broadcasting locally in analog on UHF channel 43. Founded June 20, 1994, the station was owned and operated by the Daystar Television Network of Fort Worth, Texas.

History 
The FCC granted an original construction permit on June 20, 1994 for a low-power television station on channel 43 to serve the Cheyenne market. The permit for the station, given callsign K43CM, was awarded to Aracelis Ortiz of Faith Pleases God Church in Harlingen, Texas, operators of Spanish-language religious television stations. The permittee was not able to timely build the station, and the permit was canceled and callsign deleted. However, the FCC later renewed the construction permit, and in June 1998, Ortiz completed a sale of the permit to Daystar, who was granted a license for the station on October 25, 1999. The license for the station was upgraded to Class A on October 28, 2002. The station took the call letters KCHD-CA on June 17, 2006. The station's license was cancelled and its call sign deleted by the FCC on August 16, 2007.

External links 
Daystar Official Site

Defunct television stations in the United States
Religious television stations in the United States
Television channels and stations established in 1994
Television channels and stations disestablished in 2007
1994 establishments in Wyoming
2007 disestablishments in Wyoming
CHD-CA